"Sticks and Stones" is an R&B song, written by Titus Turner.

The song is best known in a 1960 version by Ray Charles, who added the Latin drum part. It was his first R&B hit with ABC-Paramount, followed in 1961 with "Hit The Road Jack".

The song was also covered by Jerry Lee Lewis, The Zombies, Wanda Jackson and The Kingsmen, The Righteous Brothers on Just Once in My Life, as well as Joe Cocker on Mad Dogs and Englishmen, and Elvis Costello in 1994 on the extended play version of Kojak Variety.  In 1997, jazz singer Roseanna Vitro included the tune in her tribute to Charles, Catchin’ Some Rays: The Music of Ray Charles. In Australia The Vince Maloney Sect recorded the song in 1966. Vince went to England and joined The Bee Gees.

References

1960 songs
1960 singles
Ray Charles songs
Songs written by Titus Turner